Conuber conicum, the conical moon snail, is a species of predatory sea snail, in the family Naticidae, the moon snails.  It was first described in 1822 as Natica conica by Jean-Baptiste Lamarck.

Description
The length of the shell attains 10 mm, its dimaeter 6 mm.

(Described as Natica tasmanica) The shell has a somewhat covered umbilicus. It is depressedly orbicular, thick, with a short but slightly exsert spire. The whorls are convex, rounded, smooth, or obliquely thickly and most minutely striate. The aperture is semilunar and horizontal. The columella is somewhat thin, with a prominent callosity, which is spirally sulcate. The umbilicus is angularly excavate; with a kind of callosity 
within the suture at the aperture. The shell is pale fulvous or whitish, banded with brownish or orange lines. The base of the shell is white, chestnut or fulvous within.

Distribution
This species is endemic to Australia (New South Wales, Queensland, South Australia, Tasmania, Victoria, Western Australia). It is a carnivorous marine snail found on intertidal sand flats, all around Australia.  It feeds on small bivalves.

References

 Hedley, C. 1916. A preliminary index of the Mollusca of Western Australia. Journal and Proceedings of the Royal Society of Western Australia 1: 152-226 
 Iredale, T. & McMichael, D.F. 1962. A reference list of the marine Mollusca of New South Wales. Memoirs of the Australian Museum 11: 1–109
 Murray, F.V. 1963. Notes on the spawn and early life history of two species of Conuber Finlay & Marwick, 1937 (Naticidae). Journal of the Malacological Society of Australasia 1(6): 49-58
 Macpherson, J.H. 1966. Port Phillip Survey 1957–1963. Memoirs of the National Museum of Victoria, Melbourne 27: 201–288 
 Coleman, N. 1975. What Shell is That? Sydney : Lansdowne Press 298 pp. 
 Wells, F.E. & Bryce, C.W. 1986. Seashells of Western Australia. Perth : Western Australian Museum 207 pp. 
 Wilson, B. 1993. Australian Marine Shells. Prosobranch Gastropods. Kallaroo, Western Australia : Odyssey Publishing Vol. 1 408 pp.

External links
Conuber conicum images & occurrence data from GBIF
Conuber conicum images at iNaturalist 
 Adams, A. & Reeve, L. A. (1848-1850). Mollusca. In A. Adams (ed.), The zoology of the voyage of H.M.S. Samarang, under the command of Captain Sir Edward Belcher, C.B., F.R.A.S., F.G.S., during the years 1843-1846. Reeve & Benham, London, x + 87 pp., 24 pls
  Reeve, L. A. (1855). Monograph of the genus Natica. In: Conchologia Iconica, or, illustrations of the shells of molluscous animals, vol. 9, pls 1-30, and unpaginated text. L. Reeve & Co., London
 https://www.biodiversitylibrary.org/page/16085066
  Torigoe K. & Inaba A. (2011). Revision on the classification of Recent Naticidae. Bulletin of the Nishinomiya Shell Museum. 7: 133 + 15 pp., 4 pls
 Huelsken T., Tapken D., Dahlmann T., Wägele H., Riginos C. & Hollmann M. (2012) Systematics and phylogenetic species delimitation within Polinices s.l. (Caenogastropoda: Naticidae) based on molecular data and shell morphology. Organisms, Diversity & Evolution 12: 349-375
 Beechey, D. 2000. Conuber conicum (Lamarck, 1822). The seashells of New South Wales website.

Naticidae
Gastropods described in 1822
Taxa named by Jean-Baptiste Lamarck
Gastropods of Australia